Toby the Pup is an animated cartoon character created by animators Sid Marcus, Dick Huemer, and Art Davis. He starred in a series of early sound shorts produced by Charles B. Mintz for RKO Radio Pictures. The series lasted from 1930 to 1931. Twelve cartoons were produced, though only seven still survive today. The character was voiced by Dick Huemer.

Toby can be seen dancing in one of the scenes of the movie, Cool World.

History
In 1930, Charles Mintz, while simultaneously producing the Krazy Kat cartoon series for Columbia, decided to create an additional series to be distributed through RKO Radio Pictures. He hired two Fleischer animators, Dick Huemer and Sid Marcus and assigned them to work with Art Davis to create a new series. Marcus, who worked for the Mintz studio when it was still located in New York City, devised Toby the Pup. Toby was very similar to Fleischer's Bimbo, in both personality and character design. He wore a custodian hat, and a pair of shoes that look like dog feet. Despite the series' success, it concluded after only twelve films; most likely because of RKO's ties with the Van Beuren studio. However, by the time the series ended, Mintz was already negotiating with Columbia for backing on a second cartoon series headed again by Huemer, Marcus, and Davis. This time, Huemer devised a new character, a small boy named Scrappy.

Today, some of the Toby cartoons are known to exist. Only a fragment of The Museum exists in the Library of Congress. Prints of the short have turned up in a few private film collections in the United States and four were discovered in Europe. UCLA currently owns a sound print of Circus Time. Cartoon Factory, a syndicated compilation of public domain cartoons distributed throughout Europe, featured three Toby cartoons, The Milkman, Down South, and Halloween. Lobster Films, the company behind the program, currently holds these titles. A substantial fragment of The Showman has also surfaced. In 2005, a full 16mm print of The Brown Derby was found in a private collection in San Marcos, Texas, by Toby Heidel. The print is currently housed at UCLA and restoration is being attempted by Jere Guldin.

Filmography

1930

1931

See also 
 The Golden Age of American animation

References 

 Maltin, Leonard (1987): Of Mice and Magic: A History of American Animated Cartoons. Penguin Books.

External links
 Cartoon Research

Animated film series
Animated characters
Film characters introduced in 1930
Film series introduced in 1930
Fictional dogs